The Needle is a fictional character, a mutant supervillain appearing in American comic books published by Marvel Comics. Created by Mark Gruenwald, Carmine Infantino, and Al Gordon, the character first appeared in Spider-Woman #9 (December 1978).

Publication history
The character's origin was recounted in his debut appearance in Spider-Woman #9.

Creator Mark Gruenwald brought the character back during his run on the West Coast Avengers as a member of the villain team Night Shift, which included other former Spider-Woman foes.

Fictional character biography
After being mugged one night while leaving work, Josef Saint, an elderly tailor, lost an eye and his ability to speak. While recuperating, he discovered that he has the power to paralyze with his gaze. Seeking revenge, Saint assumed the guise of the vigilante the Needle. Armed with a yard-long needle, the mute villain attacked young men on the streets at night, sewing their mouths shut. After victimizing S.H.I.E.L.D. agent Jerry Hunt, the Needle incurred the wrath of Spider-Woman, the agent's girlfriend, and she took him out with a close-range venom blast. He was subsequently arrested.

With other superhuman adventurers and criminals, the Needle was imprisoned by the Locksmith, but then freed by Spider-Woman.

The Needle joined the Night Shift, and teamed with Captain America against the Power Broker and his augmented mutates. Alongside the Night Shift, he tested Moon Knight to take over as the leader of the Night Shift. Later, alongside the Night Shift, he battled the West Coast Avengers. Alongside the Night Shift, the second Hangman, and Satannish, he battled the Avengers West Coast; his abilities had been enhanced by Satannish's black magic.

The Needle was later defeated by Armory.

Needle appears with the Night Shift, as part of the Hood's gang. They battle the Midnight Sons, and Needle impales Daimon Hellstrom with his needle, before Jennifer Kale knocks him off with a spell. He and the Night Shift are killed when the zombie virus mutates and becomes airborne. The virus cloud begins to rain blood, and reanimates the Night Shift as zombies. Dormammu assumes control of the Night Shift and uses them to fight the Midnight Sons. When Jennifer Kale and the Black Talon contain the virus within the Zombie (Simon Garth), the Night Shift members are apparently restored to normal, and the Hood teleports away with them.

Powers and abilities
Needle has the ability to hypnotically paralyze a victim with his gaze, and is also gifted with enhanced agility and strength. The Needle is mute and mentally disturbed. He is an expert tailor.

For a time, the Needle's powers were enhanced by Satannish, increasing his physical attributes to that of an athletic man, allowing his hypnotic gaze to work instantaneously, and rendering his weapon sharp enough to rend cinder block.

References

External links
The Needle's entry at the Marvel Directory

http://www.marvel.com/universe/Needle

Characters created by Carmine Infantino
Characters created by Mark Gruenwald
Comics characters introduced in 1978
Marvel Comics mutants
Marvel Comics supervillains